Brian James Boquist (born October 20, 1958) is an Independent, formerly Republican, politician from Oregon; he currently serves in the Oregon Senate representing District 12. Previously, he was in the Oregon House of Representatives, representing District 23 in the mid-Willamette Valley from 2005 to 2009.

In Oregon, members of the Independent Party are not to be confused with non-affiliated voters. The Independent Party of Oregon is the largest minor party in the state.

Early life and career
Boquist was born and raised on a dairy farm in Tillamook, Oregon. He attained the rank of Eagle Scout in the Boy Scouts of America, graduated from Tillamook High School, and enlisted in the United States Army in 1975. He earned a Bachelor of Science degree from Western Oregon State College (now Western Oregon University) and an MBA from Oregon State University.

Boquist is a former career special forces lieutenant colonel who served in branches of the United States Army.  He is a director with International Charter Incorporated, an international services company that specializes in a variety of support operations for private organizations and the United States government. ICI has worked in Africa, Asia, the Middle East, and South America.  Additionally, ICI was involved in pre-deployment training of armed services members during OEF and OIF from 2006 to 2012.  Boquist is involved with several other business entities primarily in the agriculture and forestry industry.  He served as Deputy Commander and Chief of Staff of the Joint Combined Special Operations Task Force in Iraq in 2003–2004, receiving the Bronze Star Medal and recommendation for promotion for his service.

Political career
Boquist ran for the U.S. Senate in 1996, taking less than 1% in the Republican primary. In 2000, he was the Republican nominee for the United States House of Representatives in Oregon's 5th congressional district, but lost with 43% of the vote to incumbent Darlene Hooley. Boquist challenged Darlene Hooley in the 2002 General Election, losing a second time with 45% of the vote.

In 2004, Boquist decided against a run for Hooley's seat, but when state Representative Lane Shetterly resigned to run the Oregon Department of Land Conservation and Development commission, Boquist chose instead to run for Shetterly's seat in Oregon House District 23. Though Jim Thompson was named by Oregon Republicans to complete Shetterly's term, Boquist defeated him in the Republican primary and went on to win the general election with 61% (17,390) of the vote. Boquist was re-elected to the Oregon House of Representatives in 2006 with 58% (13,422) of the vote.

In the 2008 Republican primary, Boquist announced that he was leaving the Oregon House to seek election to the state Senate. He was unopposed for his party's nomination to represent Oregon Senate District 12 and faced Democrat Kevin Nortness in the general election. He won the general election 61% to 39% garnering 33,264 votes. (Jim Thompson, whom Boquist defeated for the state House in 2004, won the election with 15,878 votes to succeed Boquist in the House.)  Boquist was re-elected the Oregon State Senate in 2012 with 60% of the vote, garnering 34,038 votes.

Boquist serves as the Chairman of the Veterans and Emergency Preparedness Committee in the Oregon State Senate. He was closely involved in the 2013 Regular Session, and following Special Session, with the passage of a tax cut meant to incentivize job growth in rural Oregon. He was appointed to serve on the oversight committee for the start up of the Cover Oregon insurance exchange, during which time he sought expanded committee authority to place witnesses under oath and subpoena testimony; neither was granted to the now defunct committee.

In June 2019, Boquist and 11 other Republican Senators walked out of a vote on a cap and trade resolution meant to reduce carbon emissions for the purpose of dealing with climate change. Under the Oregon Constitution, the Senate required two-thirds of lawmakers to be present to establish a quorum to do any business. Since the 12 Republican senators left the Oregon State Capitol (with some claiming to have left the state), the remaining 18 senators could not meet - 20 was the minimum to hold any voting.

The previous day, Oregon Governor Kate Brown, on learning of the upcoming walkout, said she was going to send police to round up state legislators who didn't attend. Brown said the Oregon constitution allowed for the use of police to detain recusant Senators.

In response, Boquist said commented to reporters that he had told the state police superintendent, "Send bachelors and come heavily armed. I'm not going to be a political prisoner in the state of Oregon."  With the Senate facing a constitutionally required adjournment Although several Republican state senators returned to the Senate chamber on June 29, 2019, leading to the cap and trade bill being sent back to committee, while other bills were passed, Boquist was missing, as he was asked not to return due to other state senators feeling unsafe from his previous comments. He was provided a "12 hour rule," requiring him to notify members 12 hours before entering the Capitol building to allow for heavier police presence. In an opinion filed April 21, 2022, the U.S. Court of Appeals for the Ninth Circuit ruled that Boquist's lawsuit for First Amendment retaliation stemming from his statement on the Senate floor may proceed against State Senators Peter Courtney, Floyd Prozanski, and James Manning.

Personal life
Boquist and his wife Peggy have six adult children and live near Dallas, Oregon.  Their son Sethan Charles Sprague committed suicide in 2016 at age 31.

See also
 74th Oregon Legislative Assembly
 75th Oregon Legislative Assembly
 76th Oregon Legislative Assembly
 77th Oregon Legislative Assembly
 78th Oregon Legislative Assembly

References

External links
Legislative website
Project VoteSmart biography
International Charter Incorporated of Oregon website

Living people
1958 births
Republican Party members of the Oregon House of Representatives
People from Tillamook, Oregon
Oregon State University alumni
Western Oregon University alumni
People from Dallas, Oregon
Military personnel from Oregon
Republican Party Oregon state senators
United States Army colonels
21st-century American politicians
Independent Party of Oregon politicians